WNF may refer to:
 Weld neck flange
 West Nile fever
 Wiener Neustädter Flugzeugwerke, aircraft manufacturers of the Bánhidi Gerle
 WNF Wn 11, aircraft designed by the Wiener Neustädter Flugzeugwerke
 Wold Newton family